D'Molls, originally known as The Chicago Molls, were an American heavy metal and glam metal band, featuring lead vocalist/guitarist Desi Rexx, bassist Lizzy Valentine, guitarist S.S. Priest, and drummer Billy Dior In 1985 D'Molls relocated to Los Angeles, California to pursue a recording contract. Priest was still under contract with his other band Diamond Rexx, and could not follow the band there and was replaced by another guitarist, Sean Freehill. Priest rejoined the band in 1986, after they signed a recording contract with Atlantic Records. The video for "777" received some airplay on MTV, but album sales failed to prosper. In 1990, the band released their second album, Warped, but their singer quit before the promotion campaign got off the ground.  The group disbanded shortly thereafter and did not release another album until 1996, when Delinquent Records featured the group's third and final album, Beyond D'Valley Of D'Molls, which featured three live tracks as well as previously unreleased studio recordings.  There also exists a best of, compilation CD, The Best of Everything, which came out in 2007. In 2011 Desi Rexx released Desi Rexx's D'Moll's "D'Sides"  on FnA Records.

Desi Rexx reformed the band with Jonni Lightfoot (Air Supply 2001 - 2016) in 2018 and now go under the name D'Molls 777. They released their first single "Blue" on Valley of Fire Records February 14, 2023.

Billy Dior was reportedly in the bands Kid Rocker, and the Screamin' Mimis with future Poison guitarist C.C. Deville, prior to joining D'Molls. In 2015, Dior sued Poison for copyright infringement on several Poison hit songs, including, "Talk Dirty To Me," for which the band failed to credit him as co-writer.  Poison ultimately settled with Dior out of court for an undeclared sum. He went on to publish a thriller novel in 2004 under his birth name, Billy McCarthy, The Devil of Shakespeare, inspired in part by his experiences with the band and the 1980s Los Angeles glam rock scene.  In 2017, McCarthy published his sophomore effort at writing, Beat Me Till I'm Famous, an autobiographical memoir of his rags to rags experience as a professional musician in the 1980s, most of which covers the entire D'Molls story.

In 2018, D'Molls 1988 debut album was remastered and re-released on Rock Candy Records.

In February 2023 D'Molls 777 released their first new single in many years "Blue" on Valley of Fire Records

Discography

Single's 
BLUE Single Released under D'Molls 777 (February 14, 2023) Valley of Fire Records

Studio albums
D'Molls (1988)

Warped (June 28, 1990)Beyond D'Valley Of D'Molls (1997)

Desi Rexx's D'Molls "D'Sides" (2011) FnA Records

Compilation albums
 The Best of Everything (2007)

Live albums
 Desi Rexx & S.S. Priest of D'Molls Double Platinum Live (2009)

Former members
 S.S. Priest - lead guitar (1984-1985; 1986-1991)
 Sean Freehill - lead guitar (1985)
 Lizzy Valentine - bass guitar (1984-1991)
 Billy Dior - drums (1984-1991)

References

External links
 D'Molls 777 Facebook 
 Billy Dior/McCarthy interview at sleazeroxx.com
 D’Molls | Delinquent Records, USA Est'l 1987 at delinquentrecordsusa.com 
 

1984 establishments in Illinois
1991 disestablishments in Illinois
Glam metal musical groups from Illinois
Heavy metal musical groups from Illinois
Musical groups established in 1984
Musical groups disestablished in 1991
Musical groups from Chicago